3-Amino-5-nitrosalicylic acid is an aromatic compound that absorbs light strongly at 540 nm.  It is produced when 3,5-dinitrosalicylic acid reacts with a reducing sugar. In this reaction, the 3-nitro group (NOO−) is reduced to an amino group (NH2).

References

Nitrophenols
Salicylic acids
Anilines